Sanjay Memorial Institute of Technology (SMIT) is a college located in Berhampur, Odisha, India. It offers education in engineering (Bachelor of Technology), library science, and management. SMIT was founded by the late Brundaban Nayak in the year 1980.
 The campus is located on NH217. Surrounding the campus is an Ayurvedic college with agricultural land.

History
The first of its facilities were set up in Ankuspur in the outskirts of Berhampur. The campus has a series of buildings for different functions, including separate buildings for management, diploma, library science and laboratories. The campus has a boys' hostel with a small cricket and football ground.

The degree engineering course started in 1997 and is affiliated with Biju Patnaik University of Technology. It now operates from a different campus, located at Chandipadar.

Courses
Masters in Management Program
 Marketing
 Finance

Degree Engineering College
 Electronics and communication engineering
 Electrical engineering
 Mechanical engineering
 Civil engineering
 Computer science
 Electrical and electronics engineering

Diploma in Engineering
 Electrical engineering
 Mechanical engineering
 Civil engineering

 Department of Library & Information Science
 Bachelor of Library & Information Science
 Master of Library & Information Science

References

Engineering colleges in Odisha
Business schools in Odisha
Colleges affiliated with Biju Patnaik University of Technology
Education in Berhampur
Educational institutions established in 1980
1980 establishments in Orissa